In heraldry, gules is the tincture with the colour red. It is one of the class of five dark tinctures called "colours", the others being azure (blue), sable (black), vert (green) and purpure (purple).

In engraving, it is sometimes depicted by hatching of vertical lines. In tricking—abbreviations written in areas to indicate their tinctures—it is marked with gu.

Etymology
The term gules derives from the Old French word , literally "throats" (related to the English gullet; modern French ), but also used to refer to a fur neckpiece, usually made of red fur.

A.C. Fox-Davies states that the term originates from the Persian word  , "rose", but according to Brault, there is no evidence to support this derivation.

Examples

Gules is the most widely used heraldic tincture. Through the sixteenth century, nearly half of all noble coats of arms in Poland had a field gules with one or more argent charges on them.

Examples of coats of arms consisting of purely a red shield (blazoned gules plain) include those of the d'Albret family, the Rossi family, the Swiss canton of Schwyz (prior to 1815), and the old coats of arms of the cities of Nîmes and Montpellier.

See also
 Polish heraldry
 Cinnabar
 Murrey
 Sinople

References

External links

Colours (heraldry)
Shades of red